Charles-Marie Vanel (21 August 1892 – 15 April 1989) was a French actor and director. During his 76-year film career, which began in 1912, he appeared in more than 200 films and worked with many prominent directors, including Alfred Hitchcock, Luis Buñuel, Jacques Feyder, and Henri-Georges Clouzot. He is perhaps best remembered for his role as a desperate truck driver in Clouzot's The Wages of Fear for which he received a Special Mention at the Cannes Film Festival in 1953.

Biography

Early life
Charles-Marie Vanel was born in Rennes in Brittany. He came from a seafaring family and his parents were traders who moved to Paris when he was twelve years old. He was expelled from all the schools he attended. He tried to enlist in the navy, but was rejected due to his poor eyesight. In 1908, he began to perform in the theater, appearing in Hamlet. His first film was the 1912 Jim Crow directed by Robert Péguy. 

He was mobilized for the First World War in July 1915, but was diagnosed in September with “mental disorders” and sent home. During the war, he took numerous theatrical tours, notably a tour to the US under the direction of Lucien Guitry. He became a member of the Firmin Gémier theatre company at the Théâtre Antoine, before devoting himself exclusively to cinema. His first major contract was with Russian producers Joseph Ermolieff and Alexandre Kamenka, who taught him using Stanislavski's system.

Film career
He began a successful career as an actor, appearing in numerous silent films in the 1910s and 1920s, particularly in the roles of gruff and bitter characters. He considered his "real" film debut to be in Robert Boudrioz's Tillers of the Soil, which was produced by Abel Gance in 1919 but held up for release. He also appeared in Alexandre Volkoff's 10-part serial film The House of Mystery (1923) which pleased audiences and critics.

He appeared in six films directed by Jacques de Baroncelli, including Pêcheur d'Islande (1924), based on the novel by Pierre Loti, which was one of the most popular French films of the decade and showed Vanel's greater range and depth. Others for de Baroncelli included maritime dramas Nitchevo (1926) and Feu! (1927).

With the advent of sound films, his voice, and the inflections he gave, consolidated his popularity as a character actor with a wide range of colorful roles.  At the beginning of the 1930s he signed a contract with Pathé-Natan and stood out in three films by Raymond Bernard, Pathé's lead director - Montmartre (1931) as a pimp; Wooden Crosses (1932) as World War I infantryman; and as Javert alongside Harry Baur in Les Misérables (1933).

He was also directed by Maurice Tourneur in Accused, Stand Up! (1930) and Dance Hall (1931), both of which also featured Gaby Morlay. He appeared as a barkeeper in Le Grand Jeu (1934) directed by Jacques Feyder and as an airman in Anatole Litvak's L'Équipage (1935). 

The poetic realism film movement in France in the mid to late 1930s saw him appear in Marcel Carné's debut film Jenny (1936) and in Julien Duvivier's Popular Front drama La Belle Équipe in which he was Jean Gabin's friend and romantic rival. The following year, he appeared opposite Erich von Stroheim in The Rail Pirates directed by Christian-Jaque and, in 1938, opposite Jules Berry in Crossroads by Kurt Bernhardt. In 1939, he appeared as a Canadian Mountie hunting Michèle Morgan and Pierre Richard-Willm in La Loi du nord.

In Occupied France, he never stopped working but his credits were fewer. He appeared with Fernandel in The Marvelous Night directed by Jean-Paul Paulin. One of his best films and roles was in Jean Grémillon's The Woman Who Dared starring alongside Madeleine Renaud. Another was Les affaires sont les affaires (1942) by Jean Dréville.

At the Liberation of France in 1944, he was worried by the French Resistance. He explained that his support for Marshal Pétain was because of his memories as a veteran of the First World War. Vanel denounced the excesses of Vichy France, and above all, being a patriot, did not endorse collaboration with the Germans.

After the war, his career slumped and was no longer considered bankable. From 1948, he toured extensively in Italy and appeared in many Italian films, including In the Name of the Law (1949) by Pietro Germi.

The Wages of Fear
Henri-Georges Clouzot helped get him back on track, choosing him to co-star in The Wages of Fear (1953) where he played a tough, truck driver, who gradually reveals his inner fragility. Vanel won an award for best actor at the Cannes Film Festival.

Vanel was again directed by Clouzot two years later in Les Diaboliques and in The Truth (1960). He also appeared as a prosecutor in L'Affaire Maurizius (1954) by Julien Duvivier and in Sacha Guitry's Royal Affairs in Versailles (1954). He won best actor at the Karlovy Vary International Film Festival for L'Affaire Maurizius.

In his only Hollywood production, shot on the French Riviera, he played Bertani, a restaurant owner and friend of the character played by Cary Grant in Alfred Hitchcock's 1955 film, To Catch a Thief. In 1956, in Death in the Garden by Luis Buñuel, he appeared alongside Simone Signoret. He was Best Actor at the 1957 San Sebastián International Film Festival for Le feu aux poudres.

Television
The growth of French television gave him new opportunities and in 1972, he triumphed as a patriarch in Les Thibault, an adaptation of the novel by Roger Martin du Gard.

He remained very active during this decade, in particular in the role of a judge in The Most Wonderful Evening of My Life directed by Ettore Scola. A special tribute was given to him at the 1970 Cannes Film Festival. He received a nomination for Best Actor at the César Awards for Sept morts sur ordonnance in 1975 and in 1979, he received an honorary César Award for his career

Francesco Rosi directed him in some of his best later performances in Illustrious Corpses (1976) and Three Brothers (1981) where, almost in his nineties, he plays the character of an old farmer from Apulia, who is visited by his three children. In Italy he won the David di Donatello for best actor in a supporting role.

In 1986, he recorded the song "La vie rien ne va est la" with Mireille Mathieu.

His last film appearance was in Jean-Pierre Mocky's film Les Saisons du plaisir in 1988.

Directing
Vanel directed his only feature film in 1929, Dans la nuit. In 1931, he shot another short film, Affaire Classé with Pierre Larquey and Gabriel Gabrio, released in 1935 under the title Le Coup de minuit.

In 2002, at the request of filmmaker Bertrand Tavernier, Louis Sclavis composed and recorded music for Dans la nuit.

Death
Vanel retired to Mouans-Sartoux in Provence-Alpes-Côte d'Azur, near Cannes, where he lived with Arlette Bailly (1928 – 2015), his third wife, 36 years his junior. He was hospitalized in Cannes on the night of Friday, 14 April 1989 and died in the early hours of the morning the following day. Part of his ashes were scattered off the coast of Menton, the rest were placed in the cemetery of Mougins or Mouans-Sartoux.

Awards
 1953: Cannes International Film Festival - Special Mention - The Wages of Fear
 1954: Karlovy Vary International Film Festival - Best Actor - L'Affaire Maurizius
 1957: San Sebastian International Film Festival - Best Actor - Le feu aux poudres
 1979: Honorary César Award for his career
 1981: David Di Donatello Award - Best Supporting Actor - Three Brothers

Selected filmography

References

External links

Photographs and literature

1892 births
1989 deaths
Mass media people from Rennes
French male film actors
French male silent film actors
French film directors
David di Donatello winners
César Honorary Award recipients
Order of the Francisque recipients
20th-century French male actors
Actors from Rennes